The Allentown Band is a civilian concert band based in Allentown, Pennsylvania. It is the oldest civilian concert band in the United States, having been in continuous existence since its first documented performance on July 4, 1828, although its origins may trace back to as early as 1822.  

The band was known as the Northampton Band until 1838 when the town was officially renamed Allentown.  Other names included the Allentown Brass Band (1850-1862) and the Lehigh Cornet Band (1862-1864).  Around 1876, the band began using its current name.

Conductor Albertus ("Bert") L. Meyers was a close friend of famed conductor and bandleader John Philip Sousa, who recruited at least twenty members of the Allentown Band for his own organization.

The Allentown Band has a long history of performing for visiting dignitaries and dedications.  The band has performed for ten United States presidents, including Martin Van Buren during his visit to the area on June 26, 1839, marching in Theodore Roosevelt's inaugural parade in 1901, and performing for Jimmy Carter. In 1861, the band performed at Independence Hall, in a ceremony presided over by Abraham Lincoln. The band performed at both the dedication of Allentown's Soldiers & Sailors Monument in 1899, and it's centennial celebration in 1999.  The band also performed at the dedication of Allentown's Eighth Street Bridge in 1913, which would later be renamed the Albertus L. Meyers Bridge in 1974 in honor of a former conductor of the Allentown Band. 

The band typically performs about 45 concerts per year.  Many of these performances take place in Allentown's West Park, where an average of 2,500 people attend each concert.  West Park has long been home to the Allentown Band. The bandshell, designed by noted Philadelphia architect Horace Trumbauer (who had also designed the bandshell at Willow Grove Park), was dedicated on September 17, 1908.  The Allentown Band performed at the dedication ceremony, playing Rossini's overture to Semiramide. The bandshell was later named the Goldman Bandshell in honor of Edwin Franko Goldman, noted band composer and founder of the Goldman Band.  In 1927, Goldman was the first guest conductor of the Allentown Band.  He also conducted Allentown High School's band in the 1930s.

The Allentown Band was the subject of a segment on the CBS News Sunday Morning television show which aired on July 7, 1991. In 2003, the band was the subject of a WLVT-TV-produced documentary titled, The Allentown Band, 175 Years of Musical Memories.  That same year, the book The Band Plays On!: The Allentown Band's 175th Anniversary was published, written by conductor Ronald Demkee. 

The Allentown Band is part of Allentown's rich musical heritage of civilian concert bands, which also includes the Marine Band of Allentown, the Municipal Band of Allentown and the Pioneer Band of Allentown.

Conductors
1828 to 1851: (Unknown)
1851 to 1852: Anthony Heinicke
1853 to 1860: Major Amos Ettinger
1861 to 1878: William Minninger
1879: Lucas Westmeyer
1880 to 1885: Prof. Waldemar Grossman
1886 to 1926: Martin Klingler
1926 to 1976: Albertus ("Bert") L. Meyers
1977: Ronald Sherry
1978 to Present: Ronald Demkee

Discography 
 Our Band Heritage, Volume 1: Revisited
 Our Band Heritage, Volume 2: Revisited
 Our Band Heritage, Volume 3
 Our Band Heritage, Volume 4
 Our Band Heritage, Volume 5
 Our Band Heritage, Volume 6: A Tribute to John Philip Sousa
 Our Band Heritage, Volume 7: A Tribute to Patrick Sarsfield Gilmore
 Our Band Heritage, Volume 8: Remembrance of Switzerland
 Our Band Heritage, Volume 9: Salute to Bert Meyers
 Our Band Heritage, Volume 10: America's Oldest
 Our Band Heritage, Volume 11: Salute to Martin Klinger
 Our Band Heritage, Volume 12: Band Concert
 Our Band Heritage, Volume 13: Spectacular
 Our Band Heritage, Volume 14: Ye Ancients
 Our Band Heritage, Volume 15: Virtuoso! The Rare and Glorious Sound of Frank Kaderabek
 Our Band Heritage, Volume 16: Americans We
 Our Band Heritage, Volume 17: Seasons Greetings
 Our Band Heritage, Volume 18: Band on Broadway
 Our Band Heritage, Volume 19: Sesquicentennial: The Music of John Philip Sousa
 Our Band Heritage, Volume 20: A World of Marches
 Our Band Heritage, Volume 21: Blockbusters - The Allentown Band & Allen Organ
 Our Band Heritage, Volume 22: Kaleidoscope -  A Collage of Calliet Classics
 Our Band Heritage, Volume 23: 180th Anniversary
 Our Band Heritage, Volume 24: Echoes of the 1860s
 Our Band Heritage, Volume 25: Lest We Forget...
 Our Band Heritage, Volume 26: Pennsylvania Pioneers
 Our Band Heritage, Volume 27: Morton Gould
 Our Band Heritage, Volume 28: Leroy Anderson
 Our Band Heritage, Volume 29: Sousa
 Our Band Heritage, Volume 30: Cartoon Classics
 Our Band Heritage, Volume 31: Tribute to John Williams

References

Further reading

External links
Official website

Allentown Band
Concert bands
Culture of Allentown, Pennsylvania
Musical groups established in the 1820s